Metalmania was a heavy metal music festival in Central Europe. It was held annually from 1986 to 2009, and returned in 2017. The 2008 event was held on the 8th of March at Spodek in Katowice, Poland.

Metalmania 1986
First Day: Super Box, Vincent Van Gogh, 666XHE, Jaguar, Test Fobii, Wolf Spider, Turbo, Killer, Alaska

Second Day: Voodoo, Ferrum, Vader, Dragon, Stos, Kat, Alaska

Metalmania 1987
First Day: Hammer, Destroyer, Turbo, TSA, Overkill, Running Wild, Helloween

Second Day: Dragon, Stos, Wolf Spider, Open Fire, Kat, Overkill, Running Wild, Helloween

Metalmania 1988
Lineup: Genocide, Awgust, Hammer, Citron, Wolf Spider, Rage, Kreator, Destroyers, Ossian, Dragon, Turbo

Metalmania 1989
Lineup: Egzekuthor, Dragon, MCB, Open Fire, Arakain, Gomor, Hammer, Astharoth, Alastor, Turbo, Protector, Sacred Chao, Coroner

Metalmania 1990
Lineup: Destroyers, Alastor, Dragon, Acid Drinkers, Astharoth, Wolf Spider, Hammer, Turbo, Kreator, Protector, Bulldozer

Metalmania 1991
Lineup: Egzekuthor, Despair, Vader, Pungent Stench, Holy Moses, Dragon, Massacra, Acid Drinkers, Candlemass, Atrocity

Metalmania 1992
Lineup: Danger Drive, Sparagmos, Acid Drinkers, Master, Demolition Hammer, Grave, Paradise Lost, Sepultura, Massacre

Metalmania 1993
Lineup: Betrayer, Sparagmos, Kat, Valdi Moder, Therion, Messiah, Cannibal Corpse, Carcass, Death

Metalmania 1994
Lineup: Pandemonium, Betrayer, Hazael, Quo vadis, Magnus, Ghost, Vader, Samael, Unleashed, Cannibal Corpse, Morbid Angel

Metalmania 1995
Lineup: Death, Unleashed, Grave, Samael, Head Like a Hole, Dynamind, Corruption, Mash, Acid Drinkers, Shihad, Quo vadis, Tenebris, Bloodlust

Metalmania 1996
Lineup: My Own Victim, Power Of Expression, Stuck Mojo, Snapshot, Merauder, Rotting Christ, Moonspell,  Tuff Enuff, Acid Drinkers, Manhole, Drain, Fear Factory

Metalmania 1997
Lineup: Sundown, Alastis, Moonlight, The Gathering, Samael, Moonspell, Tiamat, Alpheratz, Pik, Anathema

Metalmania 1998
Lineup: Judas Priest, Morbid Angel, Vader, The Gathering, Therion, HammerFall, Dimmu Borgir, Gorefest

Metalmania 1999
Lineup: Samael, Vader, Grip Inc., Anathema, Turbo, Lacuna Coil, Artrosis, Tower, Christ Agony, Evemaster, Pik

Metalmania 2000
Lineup: The Sins Of Thy Beloved, Lux Occulta, Moonlight, Behemoth, Artrosis, Katatonia, Theatre of Tragedy, My Dying Bride, Tiamat, Yattering, Opeth

Metalmania 2002
Lineup: Paradise Lost, Tiamat, Moonspell, Cannibal Corpse, Immortal, Flowing Tears, Thy Disease

Metalmania 2003
Main Stage: Samael, Saxon, Opeth, Vader, Anathema, Sweet Noise, The Exploited, Marduk, God Dethroned, Malevolent Creation, Enter Chaos, Delight, Lost Soul

Small Stage: Elysium, Crionics, Dominium, Anal Stench, Misteria, StrommoussHeld, Azarath, Never, Vesania, Parricide, Demise

Metalmania 2004
Main Stage: Soulfly, Moonspell, Tiamat, Morbid Angel, TSA, Michael Schenker Group, Enslaved, Epica, Krisiun, Decapitated, Trauma, Esqarial & Kupczyk

Small Stage: Neolith, Centurion, Luna Ad Noctum, Immemorial, Chainsaw, Tenebrosus, Hedfirst, Shadows Land, Devilyn, Atrophia Red Sun, Asgaard, Bright Ophidia, Spinal Cord

Metalmania 2005
Main Stage: Cradle of Filth, Apocalyptica, Turbo, Napalm Death, Arcturus, Pain, The Haunted, Dark Funeral, Katatonia, Amon Amarth, Dies Irae, Darzamat, ANJ

Small Stage: Valinor, Dead By Dawn, Naumachia, Abused Majesty, Mess Age, Supreme Lord, Pyorrhoea, Quo vadis, Hell-Born, Hedfirst, Hermh, Thunderbolt

Metalmania 2006
Main Stage: Therion, Anathema, Moonspell, Nevermore, U.D.O., Acid Drinkers, Unleashed, 1349, Hunter, Soilwork, Hieronymus Bosh, Caliban, Vesania, Evergrey

Small Stage: Belphegor, The Old Dead Tree, Beseech, Centinex, Antigama, The No-Mads, Misanthrope, Corruption, Suidakra, Totem, Shadows Land, Archeon

Metalmania 2007
Main Stage: Testament, Paradise Lost, My Dying Bride, Blaze Bayley, Entombed, Jørn Lande, Sepultura, Korpiklaani, Crystal Abyss, Zyklon, Destruction, Darzamat + Roman Kostrzewski, Vital Remains

Small Stage: Benediction, Anata, Forever Will Burn, Root, Týr, Wu-Hae, Horrorscope, Deivos, Ciryam, Carnal, Sphere, Witchking

Metalmania 2008
Main Stage: Megadeth, The Dillinger Escape Plan, Satyricon, Overkill, Vader, Immolation, Artillery, Flotsam and Jetsam, Marduk, Primordial, Inside You, Poison the Well

Small Stage: Stolen Babies, Evile, October File, Mortal Sin, Drone, Demonical, Non-Divine, Izegrim, Wrust, Pandemonium, Carrion

Metalmania Fest 2009
This edition was held in Warsaw in Stodola club.

Lineup: Carnal, Incite, Exodus, Overkill, Soulfly

Metalmania 2017
Samael, Arcturus, Coroner, Moonspell, Furia, Sodom, Tygers of Pan Tang, Obscure Sphinx

References

External links

Official Polish website (English version)

Culture in Katowice
Music festivals in Poland
Heavy metal festivals in Poland
1968 establishments in Poland
Music festivals established in 1986